Semyon Alekseyevich Fedorets (18 February 1921  2002) was a MiG-15 pilot of the Soviet Union. He was a flying ace during the Korean war, with 7 victories.

Career
In 1941, Fedorets graduated from Dnipropetrovsk Aeroclub and entered the Military Aviation School in Odesa. After graduation, he was sent to the Leningrad Front as part of the 403rd Fighter Aviation Regiment. Young pilots were only allowed to participate in combat operations by May 1944, and by then the front moved away from Leningrad. Thus, he did not actually participate in the battles of the Great Patriotic War.

After the war, in September 1949, was transferred to the airfield Voskresensk in the Russian Far East. In April 1952, his unit was sent to an airfield in Anshan city, China. On 17 December 1952, Feforets shot down his first F-86 Sabre. On 19 February 1953, he was appointed as squadron commander in the 913th Fighter Regiment of the 32nd Fighter Aviation Division.

Throughout his deployment in the Korean War, he flew 98 combat sorties, engaged in 40 dogfights, and shot down seven enemy aircraft..

See also 
List of Korean War flying aces

References

Sources

External links
biography on the website "sovietaces" 

1921 births 
2002 deaths
Military personnel from Dnipro
Soviet Korean War flying aces
Soviet military personnel of the Korean War
Soviet Air Force officers
Shot-down aviators
Recipients of the Order of Lenin 
Recipients of the Order of the Red Banner